Jennifer Fopma (born October 30, 1981) is an international level beach volleyball player of the United States.

Career 
She started her career in 2005 with the AVP tours. Fopma had her best ever international (FIVB) finish with her then-partner Brooke Sweat, when they placed third at the 2013 Berlin Grand Slam.

Fopma was born in Leiden to American parents living in the Netherlands. Her family moved back to USA when she was aged one. She started her graduation at Pepperdine University, and then moved to California State University, Northridge. She is married to the Men's team's former coach, Jeff Conover.

References

External links
 

1981 births
Living people
American women's beach volleyball players
Sportspeople from Leiden
Dutch emigrants to the United States
21st-century American women
Cal State Northridge Matadors women's volleyball players
Pepperdine Waves women's volleyball players